Lucien Thèze (6 October 1913 – 7 October 1999) was a French basketball player. He competed in the men's tournament at the 1936 Summer Olympics.

References

1913 births
1999 deaths
French men's basketball players
Olympic basketball players of France
Basketball players at the 1936 Summer Olympics
Sportspeople from Aube